WD repeat-containing protein 3 is a protein that in humans is encoded by the WDR3 gene.

This gene encodes a nuclear protein containing 10 WD repeats. WD repeats are approximately 30- to 40-amino acid domains containing several conserved residues, which usually include a trp-asp at the C-terminal end. Proteins belonging to the WD repeat family are involved in a variety of cellular processes, including cell cycle progression, signal transduction, apoptosis, and gene regulation.

Model organisms

Model organisms have been used in the study of WDR3 function. A conditional knockout mouse line, called Wdr3tm1a(KOMP)Wtsi was generated as part of the International Knockout Mouse Consortium program — a high-throughput mutagenesis project to generate and distribute animal models of disease to interested scientists.

Male and female animals underwent a standardized phenotypic screen to determine the effects of deletion. Twenty four tests were carried out on mutant mice and two significant abnormalities were observed. No homozygous mutant embryos were identified during gestation, and therefore none survived until weaning. The remaining tests were carried out on heterozygous mutant adult mice; no additional significant abnormalities were observed in these animals.

References

Further reading

Genes mutated in mice